The 2016 Canoe Sprint European Championships was the 28th edition of the Canoe Sprint European Championships, an international sprint canoe/kayak and paracanoe event organised by the European Canoe Association, held in Moscow, Russia, between 24 and 26 June 2016.

Canoe sprint

Medal table
 Host nation

Men

Women

Medal reallocation

Paracanoe

Medal table
 Host nation

Medal events
 Non-Paralympic classes

References

External links
Official Website

Canoe Sprint European Championships
Canoe Sprint European Championships
European Sprint Championships
International sports competitions hosted by Russia
Canoeing and kayaking competitions in Russia
June 2016 sports events in Europe